Manuel Chaves may refer to:
 Manuel Antonio Chaves (1818–1889), figure in U.S.-Navajo and U.S. Civil War history
 Manuel Chaves (politician) (born 1945), former Second Vice President of the Spanish Government
 Manuel Chaves Nogales, Spanish journalist